Ostad Moein Station is a station of Tehran Metro Line 4. It is located in Azadi street before Azadi square on junction with Nourbaksh street.

References 

Tehran Metro stations